Juan Carlos Báguena (born 7 January 1967) is a tennis coach and former professional tennis player from Spain.

Career
Báguena was primarily a doubles player and reached the semi-finals at Bari in 1988.

He made the second round of the men's doubles in the 1989 French Open, partnering Borja Uribe. The pair beat Australians Darren Cahill and Mark Kratzmann in what was a close opening round encounter, won 9–7 in the third and final set. In the mixed doubles he played with Jo-Anne Faull and also reached the second round.

In 1990, Baguena teamed up with Omar Camporese to win the Madrid Trophy. At the same event he also reached the singles quarter-finalist. He also reached the doubles semi-finals in Genova that year.

The Spaniard made his only Grand Slam singles appearance at the 1991 French Open and lost a five set opening match to Christian Miniussi. His best performance of the year came in Florence, where he and Carlos Costa were doubles runners-up.

ATP career finals

Doubles: 2 (1–1)

Challenger titles

Doubles: (2)

Notes

References

External links
 
 

1967 births
Living people
Spanish male tennis players
Tennis players from Barcelona